Arlanda North Station is a railway station on the Arlanda Line serving Stockholm-Arlanda Airport in Sweden. The station is one of two stations at the airport to be served by the Arlanda Express, the other being Arlanda South Station. The station is located inside a tunnel below the airport and is served by four or five trains per hour. The station serves Terminal 5 of the airport.

Service
The station is only served by the Arlanda Express, a dedicated airport rail link which connects the airport to Stockholm Central Station. The train normally operates four times every hour, but during rush hour this is increased to six times per hour. Travel time to Stockholm is 20 minutes. Standard price for a one-way ticket is 299 SEK, although discounts are offered for children, students, seniors, on special travel days and for return trips under certain conditions. The Arlanda Express is operated by A-Train, a subsidiary of Macquarie Group. The Arlanda Express operate using X3 high-speed trains.
In addition, regional and intercity trains call at Arlanda Central Station.

History
Plans for a railway line from the city center of Stockholm to the airport started in the early 1980s. Policy-makers wanted to allow the airport to grow without increasing the road traffic to the airport, and decided to build a railway. The project involved building a branch from the existing East Coast Line from Rosersberg and back at Odensala. Financing was secured by introducing Sweden's first public–private partnership, whereby a private consortium would be granted a 40-year permit to operate the line in exchange for all direct traffic and the right to collect usage fees from other train companies. The contract was won by A-Train in 1994, which started construction in 1995 and opened the line and station on 25 November 1999. This made Arlanda Airport the first airport in Sweden and the fourth in the Nordic countries to have an airport rail link, after Trondheim Airport, Værnes and Oslo Airport, Gardermoen in Norway, and Copenhagen Airport in Denmark.

References

External links

Arlanda Line
Railway stations opened in 1999
Railway stations located underground in Stockholm County
Airport railway stations in Sweden
1999 establishments in Sweden